The Girl from Capri (German: Das Mädel von Capri) is a 1924 German silent comedy film directed by Frederic Zelnik and starring Lya Mara, Ulrich Bettac and Robert Scholz. It premiered in Berlin on 10 July 1924.

Cast
Lya Mara   
Ulrich Bettac   
Robert Scholz   
Hermann Böttcher   
Julia Serda

References

External links

Films of the Weimar Republic
German silent feature films
German comedy films
1924 comedy films
Films directed by Frederic Zelnik
German black-and-white films
National Film films
Silent comedy films
1920s German films
1920s German-language films